Tahj  may refer to:

Tahj Jakins (born 1975), U.S. soccer player
Tahj Minniecon (born 1989) Australian soccer player
Tahj Mowry (born 1986), American actor, dancer, and singer